K. R. Ramasamy is an Indian politician, social worker and Member of the Legislative Assembly (MLA)

Ramasamy is the son of veteran Indian National Congress (INC) politician and former MLA, KR. RM. Kariya Manickam Ambalam, who was elected to the Tamil Nadu Legislative Assembly on four occasions from the Tiruvadanai constituency. Ramasamy junior has been elected to the same constituency on five consecutive occasions and, one tims, from Karaikudi.

Ramasamy has contested elections as both an INC and Tamil Maanila Congress (Moopanar) (TMC) candidate. His successes have come in 1989, 1991, 1996, 2001, 2006,  and 2016. The last of these was from Karaikudi, where he beat the incumbent C. T. Palanichamy.

References

Living people
Indian National Congress politicians from Tamil Nadu
Tamil Maanila Congress politicians
Tamil Nadu MLAs 1996–2001
Tamil Nadu MLAs 2001–2006
Tamil Nadu MLAs 2006–2011
Tamil Nadu MLAs 2016–2021
Year of birth missing (living people)